A novelty lighter is a lighter that is shaped like another object. Novelty Lighters can have audio or visual effects, and may look like toys. They are typically used to light tobacco products.

Controversy surrounding novelty lighters
In the United States. the vast majority of fires caused by children are started with non-novelty lighters and matches (matches are the leading cause of fires started by children).  According to the National Association of Fire Marshals, despite attempts to collect statistical evidence concerning the prevalence of novelty lighter fires caused by children, only anecdotal evidence of such fires could be found. Thus, of the 3,168 fires caused by children playing with matches and lighters in 2004 in the United States, no cases were attributed to novelty lighters by the National Association of Fire Marshals. In one such anecdotal case, on September 25, 2007, two toddlers from Russellville, Arkansas, died after setting fire to their apartment with a motorcycle-shaped lighter that was imported illegally. Such tragic cases are often caused by lighters that lack proper child safety mechanisms as mandated by the Consumer Product Safety Commission. In the United States lighters must be child safe (children under 51 months must be unable to light the lighter with 100 children being used in testing). However, lighters manufactured at a cost higher than $2.50 do not have to be child safe.

Bans on novelty lighters

On May 11, 2006, the European Consumer Protection Commission adopted a decision requiring Member States to ensure that, from March 11, 2007, cigarette lighters are child-resistant when placed on the EU market. The decision also prohibits placing lighters on the market that resemble objects that are particularly attractive to children.

In the United States, Maine was the first state to ban the sale of novelty lighters. This ban came about after the son of a Maine fire chief singed his eyebrow on a novelty lighter shaped like a baseball bat. Since then, Illinois, Virginia, Tennessee, Oregon, Massachusetts, Arkansas, and Washington have also banned novelty lighters. 

Many cities and counties in the United States have passed ordinances banning novelty lighters. They include:

California: Cathedral City, Chula Vista, El Cajon, Encinitas, Highland, La Mesa, National City, Redlands, San Diego City, Solana Beach, Vista
Georgia: Dawson County, Dawsonville
Kentucky: Shively
Maryland: City of Laurel
Mississippi: Meridian
 Ohio: Huber Heights, Dayton
Washington: City of Yakima, Sunnyside, Yakima County 
 Wyoming: Burns
Hawaii
New York
Maine (MRS §2467. Retail sale and distribution of novelty lighters prohibited)

U.S. Senators Chris Dodd (D-Conn.), Ron Wyden (D-Ore.), and Susan Collins (R-Maine) introduced the “Protect Children from Dangerous Lighters Act” in 2008, which would ban these lighters nationally. It did not become law.

Novelty lighters were banned from sale and manufacture in South Australia on 6 January 2010.

Gallery

References

Lighters (firelighting)
Lighter, novelty